{{DISPLAYTITLE:C26H35FO6}}
The molecular formula C26H35FO6 (molar mass: 462.558 g/mol) may refer to:

 Amcinafal (also known as triamcinolone pentanonide)
 Amelometasone

Molecular formulas